The 2021 Federation Cup Senior Athletics Championships was the 24th edition of the national championship in outdoor track and field for India. It was held on 15–19 March at the Netaji Subhas National Institute of Sports in Patiala.

Three Indian national records were set at the competition. Kamalpreet Kaur won the women's discus throw with a record 65.06 m – the first Indian woman to throw beyond 65 metres. M. Sreeshankar added six centimetres to his own national record to win the men's long jump. In the women's javelin throw, Annu Rani's winning mark of 63.24 m added almost a metre to her previous record.

Results

Men

Women

References

Results
 24th National Federation Cup Senior Athletics Championships 2021. Indian Athletics. Retrieved 2021-04-02.

External links
 Official website of Indian Athletics

Indian Athletics Championships
Indian Athletics Championships
Sport in Punjab, India
Patiala
Federation Cup